Meteugoa venochrea is a moth of the family Erebidae. It was described by van Eecke in 1920. It is found on Java.

References

 Natural History Museum Lepidoptera generic names catalog

Moths described in 1920
Lithosiini